Boris Gilbertson (1907–1982) was an American sculptor.

Early years
Gilbertson was born in Evanston, Illinois in 1907 to a Norwegian-Russian family and spent much of his childhood with his grandparents outside Chicago, Illinois. He began studies in physics at the University of Chicago but soon switched to art and enrolled at this School of the Art Institute of Chicago. He married Genevieve Van Metre and they made their home in Bayfield County, Wisconsin. 

Gilbertson moved to Santa Fe, New Mexico, in 1960. He died in 1982.

Work

Much of Gilbertson's work consisted of sculpted reliefs that were commissions for public buildings, including post office buildings, courthouses and government buildings. Consequently, many are part of the General Services Administration collection and have been transferred to the holdings of the Smithsonian American Art Museum and National Gallery of Art.  His most famous work may be his reliefs in the interior of the Department of the Interior's Main Interior Building in Washington DC.

Selected public artworks
 Birds and Animals of the Northwest (1937), eleven limestone reliefs, Fond du Lac, Wisconsin, post office
 Wild Ducks (1940), four aluminum panels for the post office in Janesville, Wisconsin, now at the newer Janesville post office building
 American Moose (1939), limestone relief – Main Interior Building, Washington DC
 American Bison (1939), limestone relief – Main Interior Building, Washington DC
 Cow and Calf (1943) black walnut relief sculpture for Macomb, Illinois Post Office, now in Smithsonian American Art Museum collection
 Chess Pavilion (1957), game boards, incised carvings, reliefs and freestanding sculptures for open-air structure in Chicago's Lincoln Park

References

Selected sources
 White, Charlotte, Greatness in the Commonplace: The Art of Boris Gilbertson Sunstone Press, January 1, 1988

External links

 Oral history interview with Boris Gilbertson (June 25, 1964), Archives of American Art

1907 births
1982 deaths
20th-century American sculptors
20th-century American male artists
American male painters
School of the Art Institute of Chicago alumni
Sculptors from Illinois
Sculptors from New Mexico
Section of Painting and Sculpture artists